Battle of Izium may refer to:

Second Battle of Kharkov, a World War II battle that took place in the Izium/Barvenkovo area of Kharkiv Oblast in 1942
Battle of Izium (2022), a battle that took place during the 2022 Russian invasion of Ukraine